Quercus depressipes (known as depressed oak and Davis Mountain oak) is a species of plant in the family Fagaceae. It is found in North America, primarily Mexico and the United States.

Description
Quercus depressipes is a type of live oak. It is a shrubby evergreen, growing only 1 meter (40 inches) tall, with leathery oval leaves. The cap partially encloses the nut, covering one quarter to one half of the surface.

Range
Its primary habitat is in the Mexican high deserts, in the states of Chihuahua, Durango, Nuevo León, and Zacatecas. In the United States, Q. depressipes has been found only in the Davis Mountains in western Texas, particularly on Mount Livermore.

Other oaks found in the Davis Mountains include the Emory oak (Quercus emoryi) and gray oak (Quercus grisea)

Biologists do not have enough information to determine whether Q. depressipes is thriving or threatened.

References

depressipes
Chihuahua
Trees of Durango
Trees of Nuevo León
Trees of Zacatecas
Flora of Texas
Data deficient plants
Plants described in 1924
Taxonomy articles created by Polbot
Oaks of Mexico
Taxa named by William Trelease